The following is a list of events relating to television in Ireland from 1995.

Events
24 April – Network 2 airs the long running PBS television series for preschoolers Barney & Friends at 2 o'clock. The series was also very popular in Ireland and has often been transmitted on Network 2/RTÉ 2 as years and months go by, making it one of the most popular imported children's programmes on Irish television.
13 May – For the third year running, Ireland hosts the Eurovision Song Contest. This year marks the 40th event, presented by Mary Kennedy from The Point Theatre, Dublin. The BBC had offered to stage this year's Contest as a joint venture with RTÉ in Belfast as RTÉ were concerned they would not be able to afford the cost of hosting a third consecutive Contest. Ultimately an agreement was made that the BBC would host the 1996 event should Ireland win for a fourth time. However, it was won by Norway. The winning song was the mostly instrumental piece, Nocturne, by Secret Garden, although the group's violinist, Fionnuala Sherry, is Irish.
July – RTÉ appoints Mark Little as its first Washington Correspondent.
31 August – BBC 1 Northern Ireland airs the pilot of its satirical comedy series Give My Head Peace. The programme was later commissioned as a series in 1998.
9 September – British animated series Fantomcat begins on Network 2, two days after its UK television debut.
11 September – Ray D'Arcy, Socky and Dustin are back when Den TV returns to Network 2 after summer break. The return also marks the Irish television debut of the acclaimed British children's animated series Budgie the Little Helicopter, based on the books by Sarah Ferguson. The series was also animated and produced in Ireland). Also debuting in Ireland was the US animated action series Biker Mice from Mars, reruns of the US 1960s cult animated comedy series from Hanna-Barbera Dastardly and Muttley in Their Flying Machines (this was also the very first time the series has ever aired on Network 2), plus more cartoon fun with Yogi Bear as well as the Irish programmes Pop Goes The Den, Dinin and The Joke Box and the continuing episodes of the animated series Cadillacs and Dinosaurs and The Flintstones and the Canadian Nickelodeon/YTV supernatural-horror drama for children Are You Afraid of the Dark?.
12 September – US science fiction drama The X-Files receives its first ever Irish television debut on Network 2. The US sitcom Friends also premieres on Network 2 on the same day.
15 September – The hit BBC stop motion animated series for children Noddy's Toyland Adventures begins premiering in Ireland on Network 2 as part of Den TV.

Debuts

RTÉ 1
7 April –  The Brittas Empire (1991–1997)
2 May –  The Hanging Gale (1995)
19 May – Millionaire (1995)
24 June –  The Nanny (1993–1999)
8 September – Upwardly Mobile (1995–1997)
15 September –  Blue Heelers (1994–2006)
1 October –  RoboCop (1994)
12 October –  Degrees of Error (1995)
21 October –  Postman Pat and the Tuba (1995)
21 October –  Love on a Branch Line (1994)
28 October –  Postman Pat and the Barometer (1995)
25 November –  The Beatles Anthology (1995)
Undated – Nuacht RTÉ (1995–present)
Undated –  Space Precinct (1994–1995)

Network 2
5 January –  Dig and Dug (1994)
9 January – Gerry Ryan Tonight (1995–1997)
11 January –  Mission Top Secret (1992–1995)
14 February –  Free Willy (1994)
15 February –  Aladdin (1994–1995)
2 March –  Widget (1990–1992)
19 March –  Madballs (1986, 1987)
22 April –  Cro (1993–1994)
24 April –  Barney & Friends (1992–2010)
24 April –  Sweet Valley High (1994–1997)
29 May –  Droopy, Master Detective (1993)
29 May –  Ocean Girl (1994–1997)
31 May –  The Pirates of Dark Water (1991–1993)
1 June –  The Legends of Treasure Island (1993–1995)
3 June –  Jim Henson's Animal Show (1994–1998)
12 June – Jump Around (1995)
17 June –  Hobberdy Dick (1992)
24 August –  The Biz (1995–1997)
29 August –  Cadillacs and Dinosaurs (1993–1994)
6 September –  Boogies Diner (1994–1995)
9 September –  The Marvel Action Hour (1994–1996)
9 September –  Fantomcat (1995–1996)
11 September –  Budgie the Little Helicopter (1994–1996)
11 September –  Biker Mice from Mars (1993–1996)
12 September –  The X-Files (1993–2002, 2016–2018)
12 September –  Friends (1994–2004)
12 September –  ReBoot (1994–2001)
12 September –  X-Men (1992–1997)
13 September –  Spider-Man (1994–1998)
14 September –  Harry's Mad (1993–1996)
14 September –  Creepy Crawlers (1994–1996)
14 September –  Junglies (1992)
15 September –  Teddy Trucks (1994)
16 September –  The Critic (1994–1995)
16 September –  Hamish Macbeth (1995–1997)
29 September –  Tom & Jerry Kids (1990–1993)
6 October – Finbar's Class (1995–1996)
10 October –  Santo Bugito (1995)
11 December –  William's Wish Wellingtons (1994–1996)
14 December –  The Gingerbread Man (1992)
19 December –  The Mask: Animated Series (1995–1997)
24 December –  Santa and the Tooth Fairies (1991)
24 December –  The Glo Friends Save Christmas (1985)
26 December –  O Christmas Tree (1994)
27 December –  The Wind in the Willows (1995)
27 December –  Summer with Selik (1993)
29 December –  The Forgotten Toys (1995)
Undated – 2TV (1995-2000s)
Undated –  Saved by the Bell: The New Class (1993–2000)
Undated - Models, Inc. (1994-1995)
Undated - My So-Called Life (1994-1995)

Changes of network affiliation

Ongoing television programmes

1960s
RTÉ News: Nine O'Clock (1961–present)
RTÉ News: Six One (1962–present)
The Late Late Show (1962–present)

1970s
Sports Stadium (1973–1997)
The Late Late Toy Show (1975–present)
RTÉ News on Two (1978–2014)
Bosco (1979–1996)
The Sunday Game (1979–present)

1980s
Mailbag (1982–1996)
Glenroe (1983–2001)
Live at 3 (1986–1997)
Saturday Live (1986–1999)
Questions and Answers (1986–2009)
Dempsey's Den (1986–2010)
Marketplace (1987–1996)
Where in the World? (1987–1996)
Know Your Sport (1987–1998)
Kenny Live (1988–1999)
Fair City (1989–present)
RTÉ News: One O'Clock (1989–present)

1990s
Would You Believe (1990s–present)
Winning Streak (1990–present)
Blackboard Jungle (1991–1997)
Challenging Times (1991–2001)
Prime Time (1992–present)
The Movie Show (1993–2001)
No Disco (1993–2003)
Echo Island (1994–1999)

Ending this year
1 September – Millionaire (1995)
1 September – Jump Around (1995)

Deaths
21 September – Frank Hall, broadcaster, journalist, satirist and film censor

See also
1995 in Ireland

References

 
1990s in Irish television